John O'Donnell may refer to:

Sportsmen
 John O'Donnell (baseball), 19th-century Major League Baseball player
 John O'Donnell (boxer) (born 1985), Irish boxer
 John O'Donnell (Australian footballer) (born 1947), Australian footballer for St Kilda
 John O'Donnell (rugby union, born 1902) (c. 1902–c. 1990), rugby union player who represented Australia
 John O'Donnell (Gaelic footballer) (1910–1954), Irish Gaelic footballer who represented Donegal and Ulster
 John O'Donnell (rugby, born 1993), Irish rugby player

Other
 John O'Donnell (Lewis County, New York) (1827–1899), New York assemblyman, state senator, railroad commissioner
 John O'Donnell (music journalist) (born 1962), Australian music journalist and record producer
 John O'Donnell (poet), Irish-Australian soldier and poet
 John O'Donnell (political journalist) (1896–1961), American political journalist
 John O'Donnell (Irish politician, born 1866) (1866–1920), Irish journalist, Nationalist politician and Member of Parliament
 John O'Donnell (Irish politician, born 1980s), member of Donegal City Council
 John O'Donnell (radio personality) (born 1947), Sydney radio personality
 John F. O'Donnell (died 1993), Irish-born American labor lawyer
 John H. O'Donnell, member of the California legislature
 John Harrison O'Donnell (1838–1912), physician and political figure in Manitoba
 John Francis O'Donnell, Irish journalist and poet

See also
 Jack O'Donnell (disambiguation)